Many women have served in the United States Navy for over a century. As of 2020, there were 69,629 total women on active duty in the US Navy, with 11,076 serving as officers, and 58,553 enlisted. Of all the branches in the US military, the Navy has the second highest percentage of female active duty service members (after the US Air Force) with women making up 20% of the US Navy in 2020.

No woman has ever become a Navy SEAL. In 2017, a woman who wanted to become the first female Navy SEAL officer quit after one week of initial training. In 2019, a woman managed to successfully complete SEAL officer assessment and selection, but opted to join another unit of the Navy. She was among five women who had participated in the SOAS screening process.

In July 2021, the first woman graduated from the Naval Special Warfare (NSW) training program to become a Special Warfare Combatant craft Crewman (SWCC). The SWCC directly supports the SEALs and other commando units, and are experts in covert insertion and extraction special operations tactics.

History

Pre–World War I

Women worked as nurses for the Union Navy during the American Civil War. In 1890, Ann Bradford Stokes, who during the American Civil War had worked as a nurse on the navy hospital ship , where she assisted Sisters of the Holy Cross, was granted a pension of $12 a month, making her the first American woman to receive a pension for her own service in the military.

The United States Navy Nurse Corps was officially established in 1908; it was all-female until 1965. After the establishment of the Nurse Corps in 1908 by an Act of Congress, twenty women were selected as the first members and assigned to the Naval Medical School Hospital in Washington, D.C. However, the navy did not provide room or board for them, and so the nurses rented their own house and provided their own meals.
In time, the nurses would come to be known as "The Sacred Twenty" because they were the first women to serve formally as members of the Navy. The "Sacred Twenty" were Mary H. Du Bose; Adah M. Pendleton; Elizabeth M. Hewitt; Della V. Knight; Josephine Beatrice Bowman; Lenah H. Sutcliffe Higbee; Esther Voorhees Hasson, the first Superintendent of the Navy Nurse Corps, 1908–1911; Martha E. Pringle; Elizabeth J. Wells; Clare L. De Ceu.; Elizabeth Leonhardt; Estelle Hine; Ethel R. Parsons; Florence T. Milburn; Boniface T. Small; Victoria White; Isabelle Rose Roy; Margaret D. Murray; Sara B. Myer; and Sara M. Cox. The Nurse Corps gradually expanded to 160 on the eve of World War I. For a few months in 1913, Navy nurses saw their first shipboard service, aboard Mayflower and Dolphin.

World War I
The increased size of the navy in support of World War I increased the need for clerical and administrative support. The U.S. Naval Reserve Act of 1916 permitted the enlistment of qualified "persons" for service; Secretary of the Navy Josephus Daniels asked, "Is there any law that says a Yeoman must be a man?" and was told there was not. Thus, the navy was able to induct its first female sailors into the U.S. Naval Reserve. The first woman to enlist in the U.S. Navy was Loretta Perfectus Walsh on 17 March 1917. She was also the first American active-duty navy woman, and the first woman allowed to serve as a woman in any of the United States armed forces, as anything other than as a nurse. Walsh subsequently became the first woman U.S. Navy petty officer when she was sworn in as Chief Yeoman on 21 March 1917. During World War I Navy women served around the continental U.S. and in France, Guam and Hawaii, mostly as Yeomen (F), but also as radio operators, electricians, draftsmen, pharmacists, photographers, telegraphers, fingerprint experts, chemists, torpedo assemblers and camouflage designers. Some black women served as Yeomen (F) and were the first black women to serve as enlisted members of the U.S. armed forces. These first black women to serve in the navy were 16 Yeomen (F)—the total would rise to 24
|-
| 1959
| Yeoman Anna Der-Vartanian was the first woman in the navy promoted to master chief petty officer, and the first woman in the armed services promoted to E-9.
|-
| 1961
| Lieutenant Charlene I. Suneson became the first line WAVES officer to be ordered to shipboard duty.
|-
| 1967
| Public Law 90-130 was signed into law; it removed legal ceilings on women's promotions that had kept them out of the general and flag ranks, and dropped the two percent ceiling on officer and enlisted strengths for women in the armed forces. 
|-
| 1972
|Roseanne Roberts became the first female helicopter plane captain in the Navy.
|-
| 1972
| Alene Duerk became the first female admiral in the navy.
|-
| 1973
| Frontiero v. Richardson, was a landmark Supreme Court case which decided that benefits given by the military to the family of service members cannot be given out differently because of sex.
|-
| 1974
| Lieutenant Junior Grade Barbara Ann (Allen) Rainey became the first navy woman to earn her wings on 22 February 1974.
|-
| 1974
| The first women were commissioned through NROTC.
|-
| 1975
|  Schlesinger v. Ballard, was a United States Supreme Court case that upheld a federal statute granting female naval officers four more years of commissioned service before mandatory discharge than male Naval officers. A federal statute granted female Naval officers fourteen years of commissioned service while allowing only nine years of commissioned service for male Naval officers before mandatory discharge. The Supreme Court held that the law passed intermediate scrutiny equal protection analysis because women, excluded from combat duty, had fewer opportunities for advancement in the military. The Court found the statute to directly compensate for the past statutory barriers to advancement.
|-
| 1976
| Fran McKee became the navy's first female unrestricted line flag officer.
|-
| 1978
| Navy Nurse Joan C. Bynum became the first black woman promoted to the rank of captain.
|-
| 1978
| Judge Sirica ruled the law banning navy women from ships to be unconstitutional in the US District Court for the District of Columbia case Owens v. Brown.
|-
| 1978
| Congress approved a change to Title 10 USC Section 6015 to permit the navy to assign women to fill sea duty billets on support and noncombatant ships.
|-
| 1979
| Lieutenant Lynn Spruill became the first female navy pilot qualified to land on aircraft carriers.
|-
| 1979
| The first woman in the navy to qualify as a surface warfare officer did so this year.
|-
| 1980
| The first women graduated from the Naval Academy. There were 81 women in the class of 1980 at the Naval Academy, and 55 of them graduated. Elizabeth Belzer was the first female graduate and Janie L. Mines was the first black female graduate.
|-
| 1984
| Kristine Holderied became the first female valedictorian of the Naval Academy.
|-
| 1990
| Rear Admiral Marsha J. Evans became the first woman to command a Naval Station.
|-
| 1990
| Lieutenant Commander Darlene Iskra  became the first navy woman to command a ship, .
|-
| 1991
| The Tailhook scandal occurred, in which Navy (and Marine Corps) aviators were accused of sexually assaulting 83 women (and 7 men) at the Tailhook convention in Las Vegas.
|-
| 1993
| Before the "Don't Ask Don't Tell" policy was enacted in 1993, lesbians and bisexual women (and gay men and bisexual men) were banned from serving in the military. In 1993 the "Don't Ask Don't Tell" policy was enacted, which mandated that the military could not ask servicemembers about their sexual orientation. However, until the "Don't Ask Don't Tell" policy was ended in 2011, service members (including but not limited to female service members) were still expelled from the military if they engaged in sexual conduct with a member of the same sex, stated that they were lesbian, gay, or bisexual, and/or married or attempted to marry someone of the same sex.
|-
| 1995 
|  is the first destroyer to be built to accommodate females. 
|-
| 1996
| Patricia Tracey became the first female three-star officer (vice admiral) in the navy.
|-
| 1998
| CDR Maureen A. Farren became the first woman to command a combatant ship in the navy.
|-
| 1998
| Lillian Fishburne became the first African-American woman promoted to flag rank in the navy.
|-
| 2006
| Carol M. Pottenger became the first woman to command an expeditionary strike group in the navy.
|-
| 2010
| Nora Tyson became the first woman to command a carrier strike group in the navy.
|-
|2010
|Martha E.G. Herb became the first woman Navy deep sea diver and member of the EOD community to be promoted to flag rank in the Navy.
|-
| 2011
| The "Don't Ask Don't Tell" policy was ended in 2011, thus putting an end to service members (including but not limited to female service members) being expelled from the military if they engaged in sexual conduct with a member of the same sex, stated that they were lesbian, gay, or bisexual, and/or married or attempted to marry someone of the same sex.
|-
| 2011
| The first group of female submariners in the navy completed nuclear power school and officially reported on board two ballistic and two guided missile submarines in November 2011.
|-
| 2012
| Commander Monika Washington Stoker became the first African American woman to take command of a navy missile destroyer.
|-
| 2012
|Five "Tigertails" of Carrier Airborne Early Warning Squadron One Two Five (VAW-125), embarked aboard the Nimitz-class aircraft carrier USS Carl Vinson (CVN-70) as part of Carrier Air Wing Seventeen (CVW-17), flew an historic flight on 25 January when they participated in the navy's first all-female E-2C Hawkeye combat mission.
|-
| 2012
|On 22 June 2012, a sailor assigned to USS Ohio (SSGN-726) became the first female supply officer to qualify in  submarines in the navy. Lt. Britta Christianson of Ohio's Gold Crew received her Submarine Supply Corps "dolphins" from the Gold Crew Commanding Officer Capt. Rodney Mills during a brief ceremony at Puget Sound Naval Shipyard and Intermediate Maintenance Facility (PSNS & IMF).
|-
| 2012
|On 5 December 2012, three sailors assigned to USS Maine (SSBN-741) and USS Wyoming (SSBN-742) became the first female unrestricted line officers to qualify in submarines in the navy. LTJG Marquette Leveque, a native of Fort Collins, Colorado, assigned to the Gold Crew of Wyoming, and LTJG Amber Cowan and LTJG Jennifer Noonan [ROTC Cornell University], a native of Scituate MA, both of Maine's Blue Crew received their submarine "dolphins" during separate ceremonies at Naval Submarine Base Kings Bay, Ga., and Naval Base Kitsap-Bangor, Wash.
|- 
| 2012
| Robin Braun became the first female commander of the Navy Reserve, making her the first female three star aviator and the first woman to lead any Reserve component of the military.
|-
| 2014
| Michelle J. Howard became the first female four-star admiral in the navy.
|-
| 2014
| Jan E. Tighe became the first woman to command a numbered fleet when she assumed command of the navy's Tenth Fleet on 2 April 2014.
|-
| 2014
| In July 2014, Marine Corps Captain Katie Higgins became the first female pilot to join the Blue Angels, the navy's flight demonstration squadron. She piloted the team's KC-130 Hercules support aircraft, "Fat Albert."
|-
| 2015
| Nora Tyson was installed as the commander of the navy's Third Fleet, making her the first woman to lead a navy operational fleet.
|-
| 2015
| Cheryl Hansen became the first female commander of the Naval Construction Battalion Center in Gulfport, Mississippi.
|-
| 2015
| In December 2015, Defense Secretary Ash Carter stated that starting in 2016 all combat jobs would open to women.
|-
| 2016
| In March 2016, Defense Secretary Ash Carter approved final plans from military service branches and the U.S. Special Operations Command to open all combat jobs to women, and authorized the military to begin integrating female combat soldiers "right away." 
|-
| 2016	
| In August 2016, Dominique Saavedra became the first enlisted female sailor to earn her submarine qualification.
|-
| 2019
| In 2019, Capt. Tamara Lawrence, a spokeswoman for Naval Special Warfare, confirmed that an anonymous woman completed the SOAS Navy Seal screening, but was afterwards transferred to another section of the Navy as she had not listed the SEALs as her first choice of military branch to serve with. Lawrence also revealed that the woman who managed to complete the training was among five women who participated in the Navy SEAL SOAS training program as well and that this woman was awarded membership in the Navy branch of her choosing for completing the training.
|-
|2021
|In July 2021, the first woman graduated from a Naval Special Warfare (NSW) assessment and selection pipeline to become a Special Warfare Combatant craft Crewman (SWCC). The SWCC directly supports the SEALs and other commando units, and are experts in covert insertion and extraction special operations tactics.
|}

Careers
In the navy, women are currently eligible to serve in all ratings. In 2013 Leon Panetta removed the U.S. military's ban on women serving in combat, overturning a 1994 rule prohibiting women from being assigned to smaller ground combat units. Panetta's decision gave the U.S. military services until January 2016 to seek special exceptions if they believed any positions must remain closed to women. The services had until May 2013 to draw up a plan for opening all units to women and until the end of 2015 to actually implement it. In December 2015, Defense Secretary Ash Carter stated that starting in 2016 all combat jobs would open to women.

The former policy set by Congress and the Secretary of Defense, effective 1 October 1994, excluded women from direct ground combat billets in the military, stating:

"Service members who are eligible to be assigned to all positions for which they are qualified, except that women shall be excluded from assignment to units below the brigade level whose primary mission is to engage in direct combat on the ground as defined below. "Direct ground combat is engaging an enemy on the ground with individual or crew-served weapons, while being exposed to hostile fire and to a high probability of direct physical contact with the hostile force's personnel. Direct combat take place well forward on the battlefield while locating and closing with the enemy to defeat them by fire, maneuver, or shock effect."  However, qualified and motivated women are encouraged to investigate the diver and explosive ordnance disposal (EOD) fields."

Dress
	A certified maternity uniform is mandatory for all pregnant servicewomen in the navy when the regular uniform no longer fits.

Grooming standards 
 Hair: The navy deems that hairstyles shall not be "outrageously multicolored" or "faddish," to include shaved portions of the scalp (other than the neckline), or have designs cut or braided into the hair. Hair coloring must look natural and complement the individual. Haircuts and styles shall present a balanced appearance. Lopsided and extremely asymmetrical styles are not authorized. Pigtails, widely spaced individual hanging locks, and braids that protrude from the head, are not authorized. Multiple braids are authorized. Braided hairstyles shall be conservative and conform to the guidelines listed herein. When a hairstyle of multiple braids is worn, braids shall be of uniform dimension, small in diameter (approx. 1/4 inch), and tightly interwoven to present a neat, professional, well-groomed appearance. Foreign material (i.e., beads, decorative items) shall not be braided into the hair. Short hair may be braided in symmetrical fore and aft rows (cornrowing) that minimize scalp exposure. Cornrow ends shall not protrude from the head, and shall be secured only with inconspicuous rubber bands that match the color of the hair. Appropriateness of a hairstyle shall also be judged by its appearance when headgear is worn. All headgear shall fit snugly and comfortably around the largest part of the head without distortion or excessive gaps. Hair shall not show from under the front of the brim of the combination hat, garrison, or command ball caps. Hairstyles which do not allow headgear to be worn in this manner, or which interfere with the proper wear of protective masks or equipment are prohibited. When in uniform, the hair may touch, but not fall below a horizontal line level with the lower edge of the back of the collar. On 11 July 2018 Navy women became allowed to wear their hair in ponytails, locks, wider buns and at times below their collars, although subject to strict guidelines on the matter.
 Cosmetics: The navy prefers that cosmetics be applied in good taste so that colors blend with natural skin tone and enhance natural features. Exaggerated or faddish cosmetic styles are not authorized and shall not be worn. Care should be taken to avoid artificial appearance. Lipstick colors shall be conservative and complement the individual. Long false eyelashes shall not be worn when in uniform.
 Tattoos: Navy policy stipulates that any tattoo/body art/brand that is obscene, sexually explicit or advocates discrimination of any sort is prohibited. No tattoos/body art/brands on the head, face, neck, or scalp and individual tattoos/body art/brands exposed by wearing a short sleeve uniform shirt shall be no larger in size than the wearer's hand with fingers extended and joined with the thumb touching the base of the index finger.
 Jewelry: Conservative jewelry is authorized for all personnel and shall be in good taste while in uniform. Eccentricities or faddishness are not permitted. Jewelry shall not present a safety or FOD (Foreign object damage) hazard. Jewelry shall be worn within the following guidelines
 Earrings: Earrings for women are an optional item, and are not required for wear. When worn the earring shall be a 4-6mm ball (gold for officers/CPOs, and silver for E-6 and below), plain with brushed, matte finish, screw-on or post type. Pearl earrings may be worn with Dinner Dress or Formal uniforms.
 Rings: While in uniform, only one ring per hand is authorized, plus a wedding/engagement ring set. Rings are not authorized for wear on thumbs.
 Necklaces: While in uniform, only one necklace may be worn and it shall not be visible.
 Bracelets: While in uniform, only one of each may be worn. Ankle bracelets are not authorized while in uniform.
 Fingernails: Fingernails for women shall not exceed 1/4 inch beyond the end of the finger. They shall be kept clean. Nail polish may be worn, but colors shall be conservative and complement the skin tone.

Health and fitness standards 
The Physical Fitness Assessment (PFA) is conducted twice a year for all sailors, which includes:
 Body Composition Assessment (BCA). Body composition is assessed by:
 An initial weight and height screening
 A Navy-approved circumference technique to estimate body fat percentage
Physical Readiness Test (PRT) include different standards for male and female sailors. PRT is a series of physical activities designed to evaluate factors that enable members to perform physically. Factors evaluated are:
 Muscular strength and endurance via:
 Planks
 Push-ups
Aerobic capacity via:
 1.5-mile run/walk, or
 500-yard or 450-meter swim
PT Fitness Standards (NSW/NSO programs only):
 The PST consists of five events:
 500-yard swim (using sidestroke or breaststroke)
 Push-Ups (as many as possible in 2-minutes)
 Sit-Ups (as many as possible in 2-minutes)
 Pull-Ups (as many as possible, no time limit)
 1 ½ mile run

Navy family life

Benefits
Frontiero v. Richardson, was a landmark Supreme Court case  which decided that benefits given by the military to the family of service members cannot be given out differently because of sex.

Marriage

Spouse co-location assignments are fully supported by the Chief of Naval Personnel and when requested become the highest priority and main duty preference consistent with the needs of the navy. While not always possible, every effort, within reason, will be made for military couples and family members to move & serve together. Co-op assignments are not guaranteed.

The service member requesting transfer to join with his/her spouse or family member must have a minimum of one year on board his/her present command at the time of transfer.

Military couples may not be permanently assigned to the same ship or the same shipboard deployable command. For shore assignments, the couple will not be assigned to the same reporting station without the gaining CO's approval. Unusual circumstances may require a couple being temporarily assigned to the same afloat activity, which is allowable at the CO's discretion.

Controversies

Gender identity
According to scholars, since at least as early as 1960, Executive Order 10450 was applied to ban transgender individuals from serving in the United States military. On May 17, 1963, gender transitioned or transitioning individuals were officially prohibited from the United States military by Army Regulation 40-501. This policy reasoned transgender people were medically unqualified to serve because their mental state was considered unfit. Later, after varying restrictions over the years, there stopped being restrictions on people serving in the military due to their being transgender when President Joe Biden signed the "Executive Order on Enabling All Qualified Americans to Serve Their Country in Uniform" on January 25, 2021.

Pregnancy
In her 1995 book Tailspin: Women at War in the Wake of Tailhook, Jean Zimmerman reported that there was a perception in the navy that women sailors use pregnancy to escape or avoid deployed ship duty. In an example cited by Zimmerman, in 1993 as the USS Cape Cod prepared to depart on a deployment cruise, 25 female sailors, out of a crew of 1,500, reported being pregnant shortly before the scheduled departure and were reassigned to shore duty. Although Zimmerman felt that the number of pregnancies was small and should not be regarded as significant, the senior enlisted sailor on the ship, Command Master Chief Alice Smith rejoined, "Just about every division has been decimated by the number of pregnancies. Now tell me that's not going to hurt a ship."  A 1997 study by the Navy Personnel Research and Development Center found that female sailors assigned to ships experienced higher pregnancy and abortion rates than shore-based female sailors.

A Navy policy change in June 2007 extended post-partum tours of duty ashore from 4 months to 12 months. A Virginia Pilot article in October 2007 reported on the navy's policy decision as a means to improve long term retention of trained personnel. The chief of women's policy for the chief of personnel noted that far more men than women fail to deploy or are sent back from deployment, "because of sports injuries, discipline issues or testing positive for drugs."

In 2009, Andrew Tilghman reported in the Military Times on a Naval Inspector General (IG) report noting that, in the wake of this change, Navy shore commands based in Norfolk reported that 34% of their assigned members were pregnant sailors reassigned from ship duty. Since shore-based assignments for pregnant sailors were extended in 2007, the number of navy women leaving deploying units to have children rose from 1,770 in June 2006 to 3,125 as of 1 August 2009. Tilghman further reports that Navy Personnel Command is reviewing the report.

Sexual orientation
Before the "Don't Ask Don't Tell" policy was enacted in 1993, lesbians and bisexual women (and gay men and bisexual men) were banned from serving in the military. In 1993 the "Don't Ask Don't Tell" policy was enacted, which mandated that the military could not ask servicemembers about their sexual orientation. However, until the policy was ended in 2011 service members were still expelled from the military if they engaged in sexual conduct with a member of the same sex, stated that they were lesbian, gay, or bisexual, and/or married or attempted to marry someone of the same sex.

Women on submarines
In July 1994, policy changes were made expanding the number of assignments available to women in the navy. At this time, repeal of the combat exclusion law gave women the opportunity to serve on surface combatant ships but still excluded assignments for women to serve on board submarines. Previously there had been concern about bringing women onto submarines because living quarters offered little privacy and weren't considered suitable for mixed-gender habitation.

In October 2009, the Secretary of the Navy announced that he and the Chief of Naval Operations were moving aggressively to change the policy. Reasons included the fact that larger SSGN and SSBN submarines now in the Fleet had more available space and could accommodate female Officers with little or no modification. Also, the availability of qualified female candidates with the desire to serve in this capacity was cited. It was noted that women now represented 15% of the Active Duty Navy and that women today earn about half of all science and engineering bachelor's degrees. A policy change was deemed to serve the aspirations of women, the mission of the navy and the strength of its submarine force.

In February 2010, the Secretary of Defense approved the proposed policy and signed letters formally notifying Congress of the intended change. After receiving no objection, the Department of the Navy officially announced on 29 April 2010, that it had authorized women to serve on board submarines moving forward.

The first group of U.S. female submariners completed nuclear power school and officially reported on board two ballistic and two guided missile submarines in November 2011.

Admirals
Alene Duerk became the first female admiral in the navy in 1972. Michelle J. Howard became the first female four-star admiral in the navy in 2014.

See also
 Timeline of women in warfare in Colonial America
 Timeline of women in warfare in the United States before 1900
 Timeline of women in warfare in the United States from 1900 to 1949
 Timeline of women in warfare in the United States from 1950 to 1999
 Timeline of women in warfare in the United States since 2000
 United States Navy Nurse Corps
 United States Marine Corps Women's Reserve
 WAVES
 United States Navy SEALs#Women
 United States Armed Forces#Women

References

Further reading

Bibliographies
Women in the Navy, a bibliography compiled in 1998 by Diana Simpson, Bibliographer, Air University Library, Maxwell AFB.
Women in the U.S. Navy: Bibliography and Sources from the Naval Historical Center.
30 Years of Women at USNA, selected bibliography of resources available in the Naval Academy's Nimitz Library.
Bibliography on women in the military from the Women in Military Service for America (WIMSA) Memorial

External links
Office of Women's Policy (N134W) Bureau of Naval Personnel
Sea Services Leadership Association supporting motivated Sea Service officers since 1978. (Formerly Women Officers Professional Association.)
Women Redefined - a Facebook Page for Women in the Navy
Women in the Navy Flickr Images
Navy For Moms Community

 
Women in the United States military
History of the United States Navy